Claus Christiansen may refer to:

 Claus Christiansen (footballer, born 1967), Danish football defender
 Claus Christiansen (footballer, born 1972), Danish footballer and manager